The Lords of Salem is a 2012 supernatural horror film written, produced, and directed by Rob Zombie. It stars Sheri Moon Zombie, Bruce Davison, Jeff Daniel Phillips, Ken Foree, Patricia Quinn, Dee Wallace, María Conchita Alonso, Judy Geeson, and Meg Foster. The plot focuses on a troubled female disc jockey in Salem, Massachusetts, whose life becomes entangled with a coven of ancient Satan-worshipping women.

The film started shooting on October 17, 2011, and premiered at the Toronto International Film Festival on September 10, 2012. Rob Zombie's novelization of The Lords of Salem was released on March 12, 2013, and the film was given a limited release on April 19, 2013. The film received mixed reviews from critics.

Plot
In Salem, Massachusetts, Heidi (Sheri Moon Zombie), a recovering drug addict, works as a DJ at a hard rock station with her co-workers Whitey (Jeff Daniel Phillips) and Munster (Ken Foree). She receives a strange wooden box containing an album by a band named The Lords. At her  apartment, she and Whitey listen to the record, which is a series of string and woodwind instruments playing several notes, then repeating itself. Heidi has a vision of women who worship Satan, at an unspecified time in the past, ritually birthing a baby then damning the child. The vision stops once Whitey turns the record off.

The next day, Heidi interviews Francis Matthias (Bruce Davison), who has written a book about the Salem witch trials. The station then plays the Lords' record, which causes all of the women in Salem (other than Heidi) to enter a trance. After the show is over, Matthias tells his wife (María Conchita Alonso) that the band's name, The Lords, bothers him. That night, Heidi's landlord, Lacy (Judy Geeson), insists that Heidi split a bottle of wine with her and her sisters, Sonny (Dee Wallace) and Megan (Patricia Quinn). Megan, a palm reader, tells Heidi she's fated to succumb to her dark sexual desires: "the only reason you exist". Disturbed, Heidi leaves the party. Later, Heidi notices her dog is acting strangely. She enters the supposedly vacant apartment 5 and experiences visions of a demon and a nude witch  which  commands she "bleed us a king". Heidi wakes up in bed and assumes the events in apartment 5 were a vivid nightmare.

Troubled, Heidi visits a church and falls asleep, dreaming that she is sexually assaulted by the priest present. Heidi flees the church but is faced with a ghostly entity who tells her that he has been waiting for her. Meanwhile, Matthias researches the Lords, and discovers some music in a book. After asking his wife to play the notes on their piano, confirms  that it is the same music heard on the record. Matthias tracks down the author, who tells him that in the seventeenth century  a Rev. Hawthorne (Andrew Prine) accused a coven of Satan worshippers of creating the music to control the women of Salem. As a result, Hawthorne had the women executed, but not before their leader, Margaret Morgan (Meg Foster), put a curse on both the Salem women and Hawthorne's descendants, calling his bloodline "the vessel by which the devil's child would inherit the earth". Further research shows Heidi is a descendant of Rev. Hawthorne.

Heidi's radio station announces they will be giving away tickets to the upcoming Lords of Salem concert, and the record is played  again, which causes Heidi to have more strange visions that disturb her.  Distraught, she spends the night at Whitey's home, but experiences visions before waking up in her own apartment. Heidi begins using drugs again. While under the influence of drugs, Lacy, Sonny, and Megan take Heidi to apartment 5. Inside, there appears to be a huge opera house with a demon seated on a throne at the top of a staircase. She approaches him as he screams and embraces her with tentacle-like appendages, but later she finds her way back to her bedroom.

The next day, Matthias tries to tell Heidi the truth about the Lords and her lineage. Instead, Lacy and her sisters kill him. Heidi hears his murder taking place, but does nothing. Later at the concert, Heidi joins Lacy, Sonny, Megan, and the ghosts of Margaret and her coven in a satanic rite. The Lords' music causes the female audience members to strip off their clothing. In the midst of surreal visions, Heidi blissfully gives birth to a strange creature which looks akin to a crawfish, atop the corpses of the naked audience members. The next day, Heidi's station reports on a mass suicide at a rock concert, as well as the disappearance of Heidi.

Cast

Production
The Lords of Salem is the third film from Haunted Movies, the first two being Insidious and The Bay. After directing the remake of Halloween and its sequel, Rob Zombie stated that he wanted to try something different and original. Also factoring into Zombie's decision was that he was offered complete creative freedom for the project, something that he did not have for either of his Halloween pictures. Zombie had the idea for the movie before starting on the second Halloween movie; however, as he puts it, "it wasn't really like I was working on it. I was like, 'Oh, this would kind of be a cool idea. Like, Salem radio station, blah blah blah, music', and then [I] forgot I even wrote that down." After Jason Blum came to Zombie asking for something "supernatural in nature", Zombie was reminded of the Salem idea. Despite this, Zombie stated that much of the original concept changed significantly, noting that once the project got underway that he "basically started writing it from scratch".

Filming was done quickly, at a rate faster than Zombie was used to for his movies and as a result much of the script was changed to adjust to the abbreviated schedule. Between the film wrapping and editing Zombie embarked on a tour with  his band, which he stated "was a great idea on paper, but in execution it's been insanity." The trailer debuted at Zombie's concert on May 11, 2012, at the PNC Bank Arts Center. In an interview, Zombie said that the film would be his cinematically biggest film and described it as "if Ken Russell directed The Shining". Lords became the last film of veteran actor Richard Lynch, who died in 2012 – though, due to Lynch's worsening health and being close to blindness, Rob Zombie could not film his scenes properly and was forced to re-shoot the scenes with Andrew Prine. Later, actor Michael Berryman provided further insight in the problems on set: the opening sequence involved 4 pages of scenes that called for Berryman, Lynch, Haig and Prine (in another role). However, Lynch did not remember his lines, and he was called to read a declaration of judgement out loud, but as Lynch had trouble seeing, that did not work either so the actors were sent home. Rob Zombie was not given another shooting day on location and the situation was further complicated with Lynch's death. Not given the funds to film the sequence, much of it was dropped.

Reception
The film holds a 57% rating on Metacritic based on 21 professional critic reviews, indicating "mixed or average reviews". It has a 46% rating on Rotten Tomatoes based on 65 reviews and an average rating of 5.2/10. The consensus is, "The Lords of Salem has lots of atmospheric portent, but it's unfortunately short on scares."

The initial response at the 2012 Toronto International Film Festival was overall positive, with Fangoria and  The Playlist giving the film positive reviews. Horror-Movies.ca compared it favorably to Dario Argento films like Suspiria but felt it would not appeal to mainstream audiences. Twitch Film expressed enthusiasm over the film and recommended it to horror fans. Charlotte Stear of HorrorTalk was slightly cooler, giving it three stars and saying "Within Rob Zombie I do believe is a brilliant, original horror movie just waiting to come out but sadly, The Lords of Salem isn't it." Fearnet also panned the film, criticizing the choice of Sheri Moon as the main character and focus. Bloody Disgusting posted two reviews, one panning it and the other praising it.

Nick Schager from Slant Magazine wrote: "Rob Zombie understands horror as an aural-visual experience that should gnaw at the nerves, seep into the subconscious, and beget unshakeable nightmares." New York Post's V.A. Mussetto praised the film: "Movies by Rob Zombie, the goth rocker turned cult filmmaker, aren't for everybody. But he couldn't care less. He makes movies exactly the way he wants to, with no thought of pleasing mainstream audiences. They can like it or lump it. His latest effort, The Lords of Salem, is true to form." Zombie's fifth feature film received approval from Mark Olsen (Los Angeles Times), who admits The Lords of Salem "is like some queasy-making machine, a chamber piece of possession and madness that exerts a strange, disturbing power." Simon Abrams gave the film 3 out of 4 stars, feeling Rob Zombie "tested his considerable skills and tried something different" in his first film with full creative control and describing Sheri Moon Zombie's performance as her best yet.

Awards and nominations

Novelization
A novelization of the film, written by Zombie and contributor B. K. Evenson, was released on March 12, 2013. Zombie and Evenson began working on the novelization after Zombie's manager had been approached by Grand Central Publishing about a potential book tie-in. The idea interested Zombie, who expressed a fondness for movie tie-in novels as a child.

Of the book, Zombie has also commented that it "offers a different experience from the film since it can obviously go into much more detail" and that the book is based on the original screenplay for Lords of Salem, which differs significantly from the final script used in the film.

The book also marks Rob Zombie's first time appearing on the New York Times Bestseller List.

Critical reception for the novel has been mixed. The Boston Globe praised Zombie's novelization, saying that the "writing throughout is graphic—definitely not for the squeamish—but the pace escalates compellingly". In contrast, Publishers Weekly gave a negative review for the book, criticizing parts of the book as "predictable", "unengaging and not particularly scary".

Soundtrack
In October 2012 Zombie stated that he had hired guitarist John 5 to create the movie's score. John 5 remarked that he wanted to create "material that wouldn't distract audiences but also wouldn't be easily forgotten". Zombie later released the soundtrack's central song, "All Tomorrow's Parties" by The Velvet Underground & Nico, commenting that "Every RZ movie has at least one song that gets stuck in your head and changes the way you will forever hear the song". The Lords of Salem's soundtrack was released by UMe on April 16, 2013. Although not on the soundtrack CD, the film makes prominent use of Wolfgang Amadeus Mozart's Requiem and Johann Sebastian Bach's Sei gegrüsset, Jesu gütig, BWV 768.

Track list

References

External links
 Official trailer
 
  
  
 
 

2012 films
2012 horror films
American supernatural horror films
Blumhouse Productions films
British supernatural horror films
Canadian supernatural horror films
Demons in film
The Devil in film
English-language Canadian films
Fictional depictions of the Antichrist
Films about cults
Films directed by Rob Zombie
Films produced by Jason Blum
Films set in apartment buildings
Films set in Massachusetts
American ghost films
American psychological horror films
Salem witch trials in fiction
Films about Satanism
Films with screenplays by Rob Zombie
Films about witchcraft
Films produced by Rob Zombie
2010s English-language films
2010s Canadian films
2010s American films
2010s British films